Daniel Schechter is an American film director, editor and screenwriter. His film Supporting Characters debuted at the Tribeca Film Festival in 2012. His third film, Life of Crime, which stars Jennifer Aniston, Tim Robbins and Isla Fisher, was chosen to close out the 2013 Toronto International Film Festival and was released in theaters and on VOD on August 29, 2014. His film After Class (originally titled Safe Spaces), starring Justin Long, premiered at the 2019 Tribeca Film Festival, and was released in theaters on December 6, 2019.

Filmography

References

External links

American male screenwriters
Living people
Place of birth missing (living people)
Year of birth missing (living people)
Film directors from New York City
Screenwriters from New York (state)
American film editors